Pitchanur is a village in the Udayarpalayam taluk of Ariyalur district, Tamil Nadu, India.

Demographics 

As per the 2001 census, Pitchanur had a total population of 1788 with 895 males and 893 females.

References 

Villages in Ariyalur district